Atia Weekes (born 29 May 1980) is a Canadian sprinter. She competed in the women's 4 × 100 metres relay at the 2000 Summer Olympics.

References

External links
 

1980 births
Living people
Athletes (track and field) at the 2000 Summer Olympics
Canadian female sprinters
Olympic track and field athletes of Canada
Athletes (track and field) at the 1998 Commonwealth Games
Commonwealth Games competitors for Canada
Athletes from Montreal
Olympic female sprinters